Brookes is a surname. Notable people with the surname include:

 Barbara Brookes, New Zealand historian
 Bruno Brookes, English broadcaster
 Dennis Brookes, English cricketer
 Ed Brookes (1881–1958), Irish international soccer player
 Faye Brookes (born 1987), British actress
 Jacqueline Brookes (1930–2013), American actress
 James Brooks (bishop) or Brookes, English bishop
 James Hall Brookes, American Presbyterian writer
 John Henry Brookes (1891-1975), English Craftsman, Educator, Administrator who gave his name to Oxford Brookes University
 Josh Brookes (1983– ), Australian motorcycle road racer
 Joshua Brookes (divine) (1754–1821), English divine and book collector
 Joshua Brookes (1761–1833), English anatomist and zoologist
 Mabel Brookes (1890–1975), Australian community worker, socialite and writer
 Norman Brookes (1877–1968), Australian tennis player, winner of Wimbledon
 Richard Brookes (fl. 1750), English physician and writer
Susan Brookes (born c.1943/44), English television chef
 Warwick Brookes (1875–1935), English businessman, yachtsman and Conservative Party politician
 William Penny Brookes (1809–1895), English physician and "Father of the modern Olympics"

See also
Oxford Brookes University
Brooks (surname)
Brooks (disambiguation)
Brooke (disambiguation)

English-language surnames